Adam Lowe (born 1985) is a writer, performer and publisher from Leeds, UK, though he currently lives in Manchester. He is the UK's LGBT+ History Month Poet Laureate and was Yorkshire's Poet for 2012 (the county's selected poet for the 2012 Olympics). He writes poetry, plays and fiction, and he occasionally performs as Beyonce Holes.

Biography

Adam Lowe is of Caribbean (St. Kitts), British and Irish descent. He is the son of Councillor Alison Lowe, and like her graduated with both a BA and MA from the University of Leeds. His family was the subject of the 1999 ITV docu-soap Family Life (Lion TV).

Writing, publishing and performance

Adam Lowe writes about disability, LGBT+ experiences and the lives of mixed race/Black British communities.

Carol Rumens of The Guardian describes him as a "versatile and widely published young writer".

Lowe is LGBT+ History Month Poet Laureate; founded and runs Young Enigma, a writer development project for young writers; is Editor-in-Chief of Vada Magazine and Dog Horn Publishing; and is Publicity Officer for Peepal Tree Press. He has performed around the world, at festivals and conferences, including the Black and Asian Writers Conference. He is an advocate for LGBT+ rights and sits on the management committee for Schools OUT UK, the charity that founded LGBT+ History Month in the UK.

He was formerly Features Editor for Bent Magazine and Editor of a speculative fiction magazine called Polluto.

In 2010, he was writer-in-residence at I Love West Leeds Arts Festival in Armley, where he lived. He studied under Madani Younis at Freedom Studios in Leeds' sister city, Bradford. He was also announced as a finalist for the 22nd Annual Lambda Literary Awards with his novella Troglodyte Rose (later, a selection from the book would be a Wattpad featured story getting over 190,000 reads).

In 2011, Lowe was writer on attachment at West Yorkshire Playhouse, and partnered with composer Nikki Franklin for Leeds Lieder+ at Leeds College of Music, before the two collaborated on a new work, "Mary", for the BBC Singers.

In 2012, his pamphlet Precocious (Fruit Bruise Press) was a reader nomination for the Guardian First Book Prize, which the publication described as "A vivid picture of emotions, deeply felt, but with a clear-eyed view of the ways we humans live, love and sometimes betray". He had a residency at Zion Arts Centre. That year he was Yorkshire's poet for the 12 Poets of 2012 scheme, celebrating the 2012 Olympics and the 2012 Cultural Olympiad, where he visited boxer Anthony Ogogo on a training session to inspire the writing of an Olympic-themed poem for the Queen Elizabeth Olympic Park. The final poem was performed by the National Lottery Draw Show's Voice of the Balls Alan Dedicoat at the National Lottery Plot in the Olympic Park on 3 September 2012. He rounded the year off with inclusion in MTV Books' Chorus: A Literary Mixtape, edited by Saul Williams and Dufflyn Lammers.

In 2013, he was announced as one of 10 Black and Asian "advanced poets" for The Complete Works II (founded by Bernardine Evaristo) with Mona Arshi, Jay Bernard, Kayo Chingonyi, Rishi Dastidar, Edward Doegar, Inua Ellams, Sarah Howe, Eileen Pun and Warsan Shire, which resulted in the anthology Ten: The New Wave, edited by Karen McCarthy Woolf. He was mentored on the programme by Patience Agbabi. He also made the list of "20 under 40" writers in Leeds for the LS13 Awards, where Lowe was given as an example of "the non-conformist and boundary-breaking approach to writing in Leeds".

In 2014, he toured his solo show, Ecstasies, which began at Contact Theatre's Queer Contact. He performed a poem about cruising for 4thought.tv on Channel 4.

In 2015, his Polari poem "Vada That" was selected as The Guardian Poem of the Week. His play Friend Roulette ran for a week at the Amersham Arms in London. A four-star review in Theatre Bubble said: "Friend Roulette by LGBT writer Adam Lowe, directed by Rachel Owens, sheds light on a gay friendship that is pushed by.. society? inhibitions? fear? into the confines of a chat room (Friend Roulette). But it could also be a comment on the real life app, Grindr, where users meet for sex and chance encounters. The intensity of the meetings that can only be virtual and therefore 'not real' for one of the friends, played by Robert Wallis, causes him to break free for the real world, leaving his internet friend Jonathan Woodhouse, stuck in the hell of a darkened room." The Guardian referred to the short play, in published form, as "a fine playlet that I was very impressed by".

In 2017, he performed with composer Nikki Franklin in the Speaker's Chambers at the House of Commons for LGBT History Month.

In 2018–9, he featured in the British Library's Windrush Stories exhibition, performing a poem based on the Lord's Prayer. In 2019, his poem 'Bone Railroad', about slavery and the Middle Passage was selected as Poem of the Week by The Yorkshire Times.

In June 2022, Lowe performed at the Royal Albert Memorial Museum and Art Gallery in Exeter with Mona Arshi, Victoria Adukwei Bulley, Fred D’Aguiar, Jennifer Lee Tsai, Shivanee Ramlochan, Jacob Sam-La Rose, John Siddique, Yomi Sode and Yusra Warsama as part of the My Words collaboration with the Museum of Colour, curated by Melanie Abrahams. The poets were accompanied by live music and vocals from Randolph Matthews. As part of the My Words programme, Lowe also contributed a poem called 'Seasoning' to the Museum of Colour, inspired by a set of chains used in the transatlantic trade in enslaved Africans.

Also in 2022, Peepal Tree Press announced Lowe's forthcoming debut (full-length) poetry collection, Patterflash, as "[a] collection [which] connects the poet as a wry, humane observer of the scene, particularly as conducted in Manchester, and the persona of 'Adam Lowe' as both actor in and narrator of his own dramas, who performs, exults and sometimes suffers in a wide range of guises and disguises."

Songwriting

In 2006, Lowe wrote the lyrics and performed the vocals for a hard house/trance single called 'Some Justice' with DJ GRH & Paul Maddox.

Teaching and mentoring

Lowe tutors for The Poetry School, he is a facilitator with English PEN and he teaches at the University of Leeds on the MA Writing for Performance & Publication.

Through Young Enigma, he has worked with and supported writers such as Andrew McMillan and Afshan D'souza Lodhi. Young Enigma writers have performed alongside Patience Agbabi, Gerry Potter and Jackie Kay.

He is currently a Slate Enabler for Eclipse Theatre, advocating for BAME artists in Greater Manchester.

Awards and honours 
 2013: LGBT History Month Poet Laureate
 2013: LS13 Awards: '20 best writers under 40' in Leeds
 2012: Yorkshire's Poet for 2012

Bibliography 
Patterflash (Peepal Tree Press, 2023)
Magma 75: The Loss Issue, edited by Adam Lowe and Yvonne Reddick (Magma Poetry, 2019)
Best British Poetry 2015, edited by Roddy Lumsden (Salt Publishing, 2015)
SPOKE: New Queer Voices (as editor) (Fruit Bruise Press, 2015)
Ten: The New Wave, edited by Karen McCarthy Woolf (Bloodaxe Books, 2014)
LS13: A New Generation of Leeds Writers, edited by Wes Brown (Valley Press, 2013)
Black and Gay in the UK, edited by John R. Gordon and Rikki Beadle Blair (Team Angelica Publishing, 2014)
Best New Writing 2012: The Winners of the Eric Hoffer Prize for Prose (Hopewell Publications, 2012)
Precocious (Fruit Bruise Press, 2012)

References

External links 

 

Living people
1985 births
21st-century British novelists
21st-century British poets
21st-century English male writers
21st-century LGBT people
Academics of the University of Leeds
Alumni of the University of Leeds
Black British writers
British bloggers
British disability rights activists
English male dramatists and playwrights
English male poets
English gay writers
English LGBT novelists
English LGBT dramatists and playwrights
English LGBT poets
English LGBT singers
English LGBT songwriters
English male short story writers
English short story writers
Irish male writers
Irish novelists
LGBT Black British people
Gay singers
Gay songwriters
Gay novelists
Gay dramatists and playwrights
Gay poets
People with chronic fatigue syndrome
Saint Kitts and Nevis writers
Writers from Leeds
Writers from Manchester